60 athletes in 18 sports were set to compete for Canada at the 2010 Summer Youth Olympics in Singapore nominated by the Canadian Olympic Committee and making it one of its largest delegations. Canada did not participate in the following sports: boxing, football, handball, field hockey, modern pentathlon, rowing, table tennis and volleyball.

Medalists

Archery

Canada qualified 1 archer.

Boys

Mixed Team

Athletics

Canada qualified 9 athletes.

Boys
Track and Road Events

Girls
Track and Road Events

Field Events

Badminton

Canada qualified 2 badminton athletes.

Boys

Girls

Basketball

Canada qualified a girls team.

Girls

Canoeing

Canada qualified 2 Canoers.

Boys

Girls

Cycling

Canada qualified 4 cyclists.

Cross Country

Time Trial

BMX

Road Race

Overall

Diving

Canada qualified 2 divers.

Boys

Girls

Equestrian

Canada qualified 1 rider.

Fencing

Canada qualified 3 fencers.

Pools

Direct Elimination

Gymnastics

Artistic Gymnastics

Boys

Girls

Rhythmic Gymnastics 

Individual

Team

Trampoline

Judo

Canada qualified 1 judoka.

Individual

Team

Sailing

Canada qualified 2 sailors.

One Person Dinghy

Windsurfing

Shooting

Canada qualified 1 shooter.

Pistol

Swimming

Boys

Girls

Mixed

 * raced in heats only

Taekwondo

Canada qualified 2 taekwondo athletes.

Tennis

Canada qualified 3 tennists.

Singles

Doubles

Triathlon

Girls

Men's

Mixed

Weightlifting

Canada qualified 1 weightlifter.

Wrestling

Canada qualified 3 wrestlers.

Freestyle

References

External links
Competitors List: Canada

2010 in Canadian sports
Nations at the 2010 Summer Youth Olympics
Canada at the Youth Olympics